These 228 genera belong to Cicadettinae, a subfamily of cicadas in the family Cicadidae. There are at least 1,200 described species in Cicadettinae.

Cicadettinae genera

 Abagazara Distant, 1905 c g
 Abricta Stål, 1866 c g
 Abroma Stål, 1866 i c g
 Acyroneura Torres, 1958 i c g
 Adelia Moulds, 2012 c g
 Adeniana Distant, 1905 c g
 Aedeastria de Boer, 1990 c g
 Aestuansella Boulard, 1981 c g
 Ahomana Distant, 1905 i c g
 Akamba Distant, 1905 c g
 Aleeta Moulds, 2003 c g
 Allobroma Duffels, 2011 c g
 Amphipsalta Fleming, 1969 c g
 Anopercalna Boulard, 2008 c g
 Aragualna Champanhet, Boulard & Gaiani, 2000 i c g
 Arcystasia Distant, 1882 c g
 Arfaka Distant, 1905 c g
 Atrapsalta Owen & Moulds, 2016 c g
 Auscala Moulds, 2012 c g
 Auta Distant, 1897 c g
 Baeturia Stål, 1866 c g
 Bafutalna Boulard, 1993 c g
 Berberigetta Costa, Nunes, Marabuto, Mendes & Simões, 2017 c g
 Bijaurana Distant, 1912 c g
 Birrima Distant, 1906 c g
 Bispinalta Delorme, 2017 c g
 Buyisa Distant, 1907 c g
 Caledopsalta Delorme, 2017 c g
 Caliginopsalta Ewart, 2005 c g
 Calopsaltria Stål, 1861 c g
 Calyria Stål, 1862 i c g
 Carineta Amyot & Audinet-Serville, 1843 i c g
 Cephalalna Boulard, 2006 c g
 Chalumalna Boulard, 1998 i c g
 Chelapsalta Moulds, 2012 c g
 Chlorocysta Westwood, 1851 c g
 Chloropsalta Haupt, 1920 c g
 Chrysocicada Boulard, 1989 c g
 Chrysolasia Moulds, 2003 i c g
 Cicadatra Kolenati, 1857 c g
 Cicadetta Kolenati, 1857 i c g b  (small grass cicadas)
 Cicadettana Marshall & Hill, 2017 c g
 Clinata Moulds, 2012 c g
 Clinopsalta Moulds, 2012 c g
 Conibosa Distant, 1905 i c g
 Crassisternalna Boulard, 1980 c g
 Crotopsalta Ewart, 2005 c g
 Curvicicada Chou & Lu, 1997 c g
 Cystopsaltria Goding & Froggatt, 1904 c g
 Cystosoma Westwood, 1842 c g
 Daza Distant, 1905 i c g
 Decebalus Distant, 1920 c g
 Derotettix Berg, 1882 i c g
 Diemeniana Distant, 1906 c g
 Dimissalna Boulard, 2007 c g
 Dinarobia Mamet, 1957 c g
 Dipsopsalta Moulds, 2012 c g
 Dorachosa Distant, 1892 i c g
 Drymopsalta Ewart, 2005 c g
 Dulderana Distant, 1905 i c g
 Durangona Distant, 1911 i c g
 Elachysoma Torres, 1964 i c g
 Emathia Stål, 1866 c g
 Erempsalta Moulds, 2012 c g
 Euboeana Gogala, Trilar & Drosopoulos, 2011 c g
 Euryphara Horváth, 1912 c g
 Euthemopsaltria Moulds, 2014 c g
 Ewartia Moulds, 2012 c g
 Falcatpsalta Owen & Moulds, 2016 c g
 Fijipsalta Duffels, 1988 c g
 Fractuosella Boulard, 1979 c g
 Froggattoides Distant, 1910 c g
 Gagatopsalta Ewart, 2005 c g
 Galanga Moulds, 2012 c g
 Gelidea Moulds, 2012 c g
 Germalna Delorme
 Ggomapsalta Lee, 2009 c g
 Glaucopsaltria Goding & Froggatt, 1904 c g
 Graminitigrina Ewart & Marques, 2008 c g
 Graptotettix Stål, 1866 c g
 Guaranisaria Distant, 1905 i c g
 Gudanga Distant, 1905 c g
 Guineapsaltria de Boer, 1993 c g
 Gymnotympana Stål, 1861 c g
 Haemopsalta Owen & Moulds, 2016 c g
 Heliopsalta Moulds, 2012 c g
 Hemidictya Burmeister, 1835 i c g
 Henicotettix Stål, 1858 c g
 Herrera Distant, 1905 i c g
 Hilaphura Webb, 1979 c g
 Hovana Distant, 1905 c g
 Huechys Amyot & Audinet-Serville, 1843 c g
 Hylora Boulard, 1971 c g
 Imbabura Distant, 1911 i c g
 Iruana Distant, 1905 c g
 Jacatra Distant, 1905 c g
 Jafuna Distant, 1912 c g
 Kageralna Boulard, 2012 c g
 Kanakia Distant, 1892 c g
 Katoa Ouchi, 1938 c g
 Kikihia Dugdale, 1972 c g
 Klapperichicen Dlabola, 1957 c g
 Kobonga Distant, 1906 c g
 Koranna Distant, 1905 c g
 Kosemia Matsumura, 1927 c g
 Kumanga Distant, 1905 c g
 Lamotialna Boulard, 1976 c g
 Lembeja Distant, 1892 c g
 Lemuriana Distant, 1905 g
 Limnopsalta Moulds, 2012 c g
 Linguacicada Chou & Lu, 1997 c g
 Luangwana Distant, 1914 c g
 Lycurgus China, 1925 c g
 Magicicada Davis, 1925 i c g b  (periodical cicadas)
 Malgotilia Boulard, 1980 c g
 Malloryalna Sanborn, 2016 c g
 Maoricicada Dugdale, 1972 c g
 Mapondera Distant, 1905 c g
 Mariekea de Jong & de Boer, 2004 c g
 Marteena Moulds, 1986 c g
 Masupha Distant, 1892 c g
 Melampsalta Kolenati, 1857 c g
 Melanesiana Delorme, 2017 g
 Mirabilopsaltria de Boer, 1996 c g
 Mogannia Amyot & Audinet-Serville, 1843 c g
 Monomatapa Distant, 1879 c g
 Mouia Distant, 1920 c g
 Muda Distant, 1897 c g
 Mugadina Moulds, 2012 c g
 Murmurillana Delorme, 2016 c g
 Murphyalna Boulard, 2012 c g
 Musimoia China, 1929 c g
 Musoda Karsch, 1890 c g
 Myersalna Boulard, 1988 c g
 Myopsalta Moulds, 2012 c g
 Nanopsalta Moulds, 2012 c g
 Nelcyndana Distant, 1906 c g
 Neomuda Distant, 1920 c g
 Neopunia Moulds, 2012 c g
 Nigripsaltria de Boer, 1999 c g
 Noongara Moulds, 2012 c g
 Nosola Stål, 1866 i c g
 Notopsalta Dugdale, 1972 c g
 Novemcella Goding, 1925 i c g
 Oligoglena Horvath, 1912 c g
 Oudeboschia Distant, 1920 c g
 Owra Ashton, 1912 c g
 Pachypsaltria Stål, 1861 i c g
 Pagiphora Horváth, 1912 c g
 Pakidetta Sanborn & Ahmed, 2017 c g
 Palapsalta Moulds, 2012 c g
 Panialna Delorme, 2016 c g
 Panka Distant, 1905 c g
 Papuapsaltria de Boer, 1995 c g
 Paradina Moulds, 2012 c g
 Paranistria Metcalf, 1952 c g
 Parnisa Stål, 1862 i c g
 Parvittya Distant, 1905 c g
 Paulaudalna Delorme, 2017 c g
 Pauropsalta Goding & Froggatt, 1904 c g
 Philipsalta Lee, Marshall & Hill, 2016 c g
 Physeema Moulds, 2012 c g
 Pictila Moulds, 2012 c g
 Pinheya Dlabola, 1963 c g
 Pipilopsalta Ewart, 2005 c g
 Platypsalta Moulds, 2012 c g
 Plerapsalta Moulds, 2012 c g
 Popplepsalta Owen & Moulds, 2016 c g
 Poviliana Boulard, 1997 c g
 Prasia Stål, 1863 c g
 Procollina Metcalf, 1952 i c g
 Prosotettix Jacobi, 1907 i c g
 Prunasis Stål, 1862 i c g
 Psallodia Uhler, 1903 i c g
 Psalmocharias Kirkaldy, 1908 c g
 Pseudokanakia Delorme, 2016 c g
 Pseudotettigetta Puissant, 2010 c g
 Psilotympana Stål, 1861 c g
 Punia Moulds, 2012 c g
 Pyropsalta Moulds, 2012 c g
 Relictapsalta Owen & Moulds, 2016 c g
 Rhinopsalta Melichar, 1908 c g
 Rhodopsalta Dugdale, 1972 c g
 Rouxalna Boulard, 1999 c g
 Samaecicada Popple & Emery, 2010 c g
 Sapantanga Distant, 1905 c g
 Saticula Stål, 1866 c g
 Scieroptera Stål, 1866 c g
 Scolopita Chou & Lei, 1997 c g
 Scottotympana de Boer, 1991 c g
 Shaoshia Wei, Ahmed & Rizvi, 2010 c g
 Simona Moulds, 2012 c g
 Stellenboschia Distant, 1920 c g
 Strepuntalna Delorme, 2017 c g
 Sundabroma Duffels, 2011 c g
 Sylphoides Moulds, 2012 c g
 Taipinga Distant, 1905 c g
 Takapsalta Matsumura, 1927 c g
 Taphura Stål, 1862 i c g
 Taungia Ollenbach, 1929 c g
 Taurella Moulds, 2012 c g
 Telmapsalta Moulds, 2012 c g
 Terepsalta Moulds, 2012 c g
 Tettigetta Kolenati, 1857 c g
 Tettigettacula Puissant, 2010 c g
 Tettigettalna Puissant, 2010 c g
 Tettigettula Puissant, 2010 c g
 Thaumastopsaltria Kirkaldy, 1900 c g
 Tibeta Lei & Chou, 1997 c g
 Toulgoetalna Boulard, 1982 i c g
 Toxala Moulds, 2012 c g
 Toxopeusella Schmidt, 1926 c g
 Triglena Fieber, 1875 c g
 Trismarcha Karsch, 1891 c g
 Tryella Moulds, 2003 c g
 Tympanistalna Boulard, 1982 c g
 Ueana Distant, 1905 c g
 Unduncus Duffels, 2011 c g
 Urabunana Distant, 1905 c g
 Uradolichos Moulds, 2012 c g
 Vagitanus Distant, 1918 c g
 Vastarena Delorme, 2016 c g
 Venustria Goding & Froggatt, 1904 c g
 Viettealna Boulard, 1980 c g
 Xossarella Boulard, 1980 c g
 Yoyetta Moulds, 2012 c g
 Zouga Distant, 1906 c g
 † Paleopsalta Moulds, 2018 

Data sources: i = ITIS, c = Catalogue of Life, g = GBIF, b = Bugguide.net

References

Cicadettinae